G-Fest, often typeset as G-FEST, is an annual convention devoted to the Godzilla film franchise and other kaiju (literally strange beast, also the name of the genre of Japanese giant monster movies) franchises such as Gamera and the Ultra Series. G-Fest is staged by Daikaiju Enterprises, Ltd., and G-Fan magazine. It regularly features panels, contests, and theatrically screened films of interest to fans of Japanese monsters.

Actors, directors, special effects technicians, and other famous people who worked on Godzilla, Ultraman, Gamera, and other kaiju movies in Japan are frequent guests at G-Fest. Often, the major guest is honored with the coveted "Mangled Skyscraper Award" for their lasting contributions to the kaiju genre.

G-Fest was founded in 1994 by J. D. Lees, publisher of G-Fan magazine and the G-Fan website, and the late John Rocco Roberto.

G-Fest features a Dealer's Room, a costume parade, a model show and competition, and a fan film competition. Other popular activities are film screenings (held at the Pickwick Theater in Park Ridge, Illinois) video game tournaments, children's activities, and autograph sessions. G-Fest also raises money for charitable causes.

In May 2020, Daikaiju Enterprises, Ltd. made the decision to cancel G-Fest for the first time in its 27-year history due to restrictions on large gatherings imposed by Illinois governor J. B. Pritzker in response to the COVID-19 pandemic. Its initial 27th annual convention was to be moved to the future date of July 2021, but was cancelled again, due to the continuing effect of COVID-19.

Conventions

G-Fest (Friends of G-Fan) '94
 First public meeting of contributors to G-Fan, Howard Johnson Hotel, O'Hare Airport, Illinois

G-Fest (G-Con) '95
 Date: August 18–20, 1995
 First organized convention. The first two days were closed to the public until news reports spread then was open to the public on the last day (3rd)
 Radisson Hotel, Arlington Heights, Illinois

G-Fest (G-Con) '96
 Guests: Kenpachiro Satsuma, Haruo Nakajima
 Radisson Hotel, Arlington Heights, Illinois

G-Fest (G-Con) '97
 Guests: Don Glut, Marc Cerasini, Bob Eggleton, Stuart Galbraith IV, David Kalat, Steve Ryfle
 Wyndham Hotel, Chicago, Illinois

G-Fest '98
 Guests: William Stout, Mike Fredericks, Yoshikazu Ishii, Gene Rizzardi
 Wyndham Hotel, Chicago, Illinois

G-Fest '99
Date: July 23–25, 1999
 Guests: Noriaki Yuasa, Shusuke Kaneko, Wataru Mimura, Hiroshi Kashiwabara, Robert Scott Field, Volker Engel, Forrest J. Ackerman, Peter Fernandez, Corrine Orr, August Ragone, Norman England, Hisataka Kitaoka (now Ryuki Kitaoka), Don Glut
 Films: Gamera 3: The Revenge of Iris (US premiere), Ultraman Gaia: The Battle in Hyperspace
 Mangled Skyscraper Award presented to: Forrest J. Ackerman
 Burbank Hilton, Burbank, California

G-Fest 2000
 Date: Oct 14–16, 2000
 Guests: Sadamasa Arikawa, Noriaki Yuasa, Koichi Kawakita, Haruo Nakajima, Kenpachiro Satsuma, Megumi Odaka, Keita Amemiya, Yuji Sakai, Hisataka Kitaoka (now Ryuki Kitaoka), August Ragone, Mach Fumiake, Robert Scott Field, 
 Films: Godzilla (1954), Moon Over Tao (1997), Godzilla vs. Destoroyah, Son of Godzilla, Ultraman Tiga: The Final Odyssey, Ring (1998), Rebirth of Mothra III, Ultraman Tiga: The Final Odyssey
 Mangled Skyscraper Award presented to: Koichi Kawakita
 Hollywood Roosevelt, Los Angeles, California

G-Fest '01
 Date: July 13–15, 2001
 Guests: Shinichi Wakasa, Greg Shoemaker, Bob Eggleton, Robert Scott Field
 Films: Godzilla (1954), Godzilla vs. Mechagodzilla II, Godzilla vs. SpaceGodzilla
 Mangled Skyscraper Award presented to: Greg Shoemaker
 Radisson Hotel, Arlington Heights, Illinois

G-Fest '02
 Date: July 12–14, 2002
 Guests: Koichi Kawakita, Hurricane Ryu, Robert Scott Field
 Films: Godzilla vs. Destoroyah, Gamera 2: Attack of Legion, Godzilla vs. Megaguirus
 Mangled Skyscraper Award presented to: Stan G. Hyde
 Radisson Hotel, Arlington Heights, Illinois

G-Fest X
 Date: July 18–20, 2003
 Guests: Noriaki Yuasa, Carl Craig, Yoshikazu Ishii, Robert Scott Field
 Films: Battle in Outer Space, Gamera 3: The Revenge of Iris, Godzilla, Mothra and King Ghidorah: Giant Monsters All-Out Attack
 Mangled Skyscraper Award presented to: Noriaki Yuasa
 Radisson Hotel, Arlington Heights, Illinois

G-Fest XI
 Date: July 9–11, 2004
 Guests: Teruyoshi Nakano, Robert Scott Field, Brian Thomas
 Films: Monster Zero, Terror of Mechagodzilla, Godzilla: Tokyo S.O.S.
 Mangled Skyscraper Award presented to: Teruyoshi Nakano
 Holiday Inn O'Hare International, Rosemont, Illinois

G-Fest XII
 Date: July 8–10, 2005
 Guests: Yoshimitsu Banno, Yoshikazu Ishii, Carl Craig, Robert Scott Field, Robert Conte
 Films: The H-Man, Godzilla vs. Hedorah, Godzilla: Final Wars
 Mangled Skyscraper Award presented to: Yoshikazu Ishii
 Crowne Plaza O'Hare International, Rosemont, Illinois

G-Fest XIII
 Date: July 7–9, 2006
 Guests: Kazuki Ōmori, Yoshikazu Ishii, Robert Scott Field, Robert Conte
 Films: Godzilla vs. King Ghidorah, Negadon: The Monster from Mars, Gamera the Brave
 Mangled Skyscraper Award presented to: Robert Scott Field
 Crowne Plaza O'Hare International, Rosemont, Illinois

G-Fest XIV
 Date: July 6–8, 2007
 Guests: Rhodes Reason, Shelley Sweeney, Carl Craig, Robert Scott Field, Don Glut and Reiko Yamada
 Saturday Afternoon Concert Performed by: Rieko Wada, Tomomi Matsumura, Shetoshi Yamada, Marcus Dunleavy
 Films: King Kong Escapes, King Kong vs. Godzilla
 Mangled Skyscraper Award presented to: Don Glut
 Crowne Plaza O'Hare International, Rosemont, Illinois

G-Fest XV
 Date: July 4–6, 2008
 Guests: Haruo Nakajima, Don Frye, August Ragone, Robert Scott Field, Don Glut, Jörg Buttgereit
 Films: Matango, Destroy All Monsters, Godzilla vs. Gigan, Godzilla vs. Biollante, Orochi the Eight-Headed Dragon, and Godzilla Against Mechagodzilla
 Mangled Skyscraper Award presented to: Haruo Nakajima
 Crowne Plaza O'Hare International, Rosemont, Illinois

G-Fest XVI
 Date: July 3–5, 2009
 Guests: Kenji Sahara, Robert Scott Field, August Ragone, David Kalat
 Films: Godzilla, Mothra and King Ghidorah: Giant Monsters All-Out Attack, The Mysterians, Mothra vs. Godzilla, The Monster X Strikes Back/Attack the G8 Summit
 Mangled Skyscraper Award presented to: Kenji Sahara
 Crowne Plaza O'Hare International, Rosemont, Illinois

G-Fest XVII
 Date: July 9–11, 2010
 Guests: Akira Takarada, Bob Eggleton, Robert Scott Field, William M. Tsutsui, David Kalat, Damon Foster
 Films: Son of Godzilla, Godzilla vs. Mothra, Godzilla 2000, Godzilla vs. Megaguirus, Godzilla vs the Sea Monster, Godzilla (1954)
 Mangled Skyscraper Award presented to: Akira Takarada
 Rosemont Hotel at O'Hare, Rosemont, Illinois

G-Fest XVIII
 Date: July 15–17, 2011
 Guests: Hiroyuki Watanabe, Shinji Higuchi, Hiroshi Sagae, Robert Scott Field, August Ragone
 Films: Gamera: Super Monster, Mothra, Godzilla vs. Mechagodzilla II, Gamera: Guardian of the Universe, Ultraman Tiga & Ultraman Dyna & Ultraman Gaia: Battle in Hyperspace, Gamera 2: Advent of Legion
 Mangled Skyscraper Award presented to: Shinji Higuchi
 Crowne Plaza O'Hare, Rosemont, Illinois

G-Fest XIX
 Date: July 13–15, 2012
 Guests: Akira Takarada, Satoshi Furuya, Robert Scott Field, Svengoolie
 Films: King Kong (1933), The Beast from 20,000 Fathoms, Gorgo, Gamera, Godzilla, King of the Monsters!, Godzilla vs. Destoroyah
 Mangled Skyscraper Award presented to: Bin "Satoshi" Furuya
 Crowne Plaza O'Hare, Rosemont, Illinois

G-Fest XX
 Date: July 12–14, 2013
 Guests: Tsutomu Kitagawa, Shinichi Wakasa, Shizuo Nakajima, Robert Scott Field, Frank H Woodward, Cleve Hall
 Films: 20 Million Miles to Earth, Gamera 3: The Revenge of Iris, Gamera vs. Gyaos, The X From Outer Space, Pacific Rim (Midnight showing), Godzilla vs. Space Godzilla, Godzilla vs. Megaguirus
 Mangled Skyscraper Award presented to: Shinichi Wakasa
 Crowne Plaza O'Hare, Rosemont, Illinois

G-Fest XXI
 Date: July 11–13, 2014
 Guests: Koichi Kawakita, Tomoko Ai, Katsuhiko Sasaki, Hiroshi Sagae, Don Frye, Robert Scott Field, Shinpei Hayashiya
 Films: King Kong (1976), King Kong Lives, Gamera vs. Barugon, Yongary, Monster from the Deep (1967), Godzilla vs. Destoroyah, Godzilla vs. King Ghidorah
 Mangled Skyscraper Award presented to: Bob Eggleton
 G-FAN Hall of Fame inductees: Tim Bean, John DeSentis and Chris Oglio
 Crowne Plaza O'Hare, Rosemont, Illinois

G-Fest XXII
 Date: July 10–12, 2015
 Guests: Masaaki Tezuka, Noboru Kaneko, August Ragone, Robert Scott Field, Kow Otani
 Films: Them!, The Deadly Mantis, Gamera vs. Jiger, Gamera: Guardian of the Universe, Godzilla vs. Biollante, Godzilla vs. Megaguirus
 Mangled Skyscraper Award presented to: Masaaki Tezuka
 G-FAN Hall of Fame inductees: August Ragone, Matt Frank, and Tom Tvrdik
 Crowne Plaza O'Hare, Rosemont, Illinois

G-Fest XXIII
 Date: July 15–17, 2016
 Guests: Akira Takarada, Linda Miller, Satoshi Furuya, Hiroko Sakurai, Robert Scott Field, August Ragone, Yoshikazu Ishii, Hiroshi Sagae, Carl Craig, Sojiro Uchino, Tony Isabella, C. Martin Croker
 Films: King Kong Escapes, Godzilla vs. King Ghidorah, Yongary, Monster from the Deep (1967), Gamera vs. Viras, The Green Slime, Mega Monster Battle: Ultra Galaxy
 Mangled Skyscraper Award presented to: Hiroko Sakurai
 G-FAN Hall of Fame Award inductees: Damon Foster, Ed Godziszewski, and John Roberto (posthumously)
 Crowne Plaza O'Hare, Rosemont, Illinois

G-Fest XXIV
 Date: July 14–16, 2017
 Guests: Michiru Ōshima, Yuji Kaida, Shinji Higuchi, Ryuki Kitaoka, Kazuhiro Nakagawa, Kiyotaka Taguchi, Robert Scott Field, Tony Isabella 
 Films: King Kong vs. Godzilla, D-War, Godzilla vs. Megaguirus, Godzilla (2014), Kong: Skull Island, Shin Godzilla
 Mangled Skyscraper Award presented to: Michiru Ōshima
 G-FAN Lifetime Achievement Award presented to: Shinji Higuchi
 G-FAN Hall of Fame Award inductees: Jeff Horne, Sean Linkenback, and Kyle Yount
 Crowne Plaza O'Hare, Rosemont, Illinois

G-Fest XXV
 Date: July 13–15, 2018
 Guests: Megumi Odaka, Keizo Murase, Kenpachiro Satsuma, Don Frye, Gene Rizzardi
 Films: The Valley of Gwangi, Dinosaurus!, The Mighty Peking Man, Pacific Rim Uprising, Rampage, Godzilla vs. Mothra
 Mangled Skyscraper Award presented to: Megumi Odaka, Keizo Murase, Kenpachiro Satsuma
 G-FAN Hall of Fame Award inductees: Skip Peel, David Nunes, Paul Gavins
 Crowne Plaza O'Hare, Rosemont, Illinois

G-Fest XXVI
 Date: July 12–14, 2019
 Guests: Akira Takarada, Shusuke Kaneko, Peggy Neal, Yoshikazu Ishii, Sonoe Nakajima
 Films: All Monsters Attack, Ghidorah, the Three-Headed Monster, The X from Outer Space, Godzilla, Mothra and King Ghidorah: Giant Monsters All-Out Attack, Godzilla: King of the Monsters (2019), Invasion of Astro-Monster, Linking Love (2017)
 Mangled Skyscraper Award presented to: Shusuke Kaneko
 G-FAN Lifetime Achievement Award presented to: Akira Takarada
 G-FAN Hall of Fame Award inductees: Sonoe Nakajima, the Baioa Family, Martin Arlt
 Crowne Plaza O'Hare, Rosemont, Illinois

G-Fest XXVII
 Date: July 15-17, 2022
 Guests: Hiroyuki Kawase, Tomoko Ai
 Films: Godzilla vs. Hedorah, Godzilla vs. Megalon, Godzilla (1954), Godzilla vs the Sea Monster, Godzilla vs. Kong, Terror of Mechagodzilla
 G-FAN Hall of Fame Award inductees: Steve Ryfle, Diane Dougherty, Hiroshi Sagae 
 Hyatt Regency O'Hare, Rosemont, Illinois

Notes

External links
 Official G-FAN / G-FEST website

Kaiju
Science fiction conventions in the United States